Giordani is an Italian surname. Notable people with the surname include:

 Alberto Giordani (1899–1927), Italian footballer
 Aldo Giordani (1914–1992), Italian cinematographer
 Attilio Giordani (1913–1972), Italian Roman Catholic and member from the Association of Salesian Cooperators
 Carmine Giordani (c. 1685–1758), Italian composer and organist
 Claudia Giordani (born 1955), Italian former alpine skier
 Domenico Giordani, O.F.M. Obs. (died 1640), Roman Catholic prelate, Bishop of Isernia
 Francesco Giordani (1896–1961), Italian research chemist and scientist
 Giuseppe Giordani (1751–1798), Italian composer of mainly operas
 Igino Giordani (1894–1980), Italian politician, writer and journalist
 Leonardo Giordani (born 1977), former Italian cyclist
 Ivan Giordani (born 1973), Italian bobsledder
 Leonardo Giordani (born 1977), former Italian cyclist
 Marcello Giordani (1963–2019), Italian operatic tenor
 Pietro Giordani (1774–1848), Italian writer, classical literary scholar
 Robert Giordani (1902–1981), French art director
Silvia Giordani (born 1973), Italian chemist
 Tommaso Giordani (c. 1730-1733 – before 1806), Italian composer active in England and in Ireland
 Víctor Giordani (born 1951), Guatemalan sports shooter

See also
Giordano (surname)

Italian-language surnames